The Romania national korfball team is managed by the Romanian Korfball Association (RKA), representing Romania in korfball international competitions.

Tournament history

{| class="wikitable" style=font-size:90% 
|- align=center style="background:#ccddee;" 
|colspan=4 |'    
|- align=center bgcolor="#dddddd"
|width=50|Year
|width=200|Championship
|width=180|Host
|width=100|Classification
|- align=center

| Olanda-Leeuwarden
|align="center" |10th Place
|- align=center 
|2015
|2015 Korfball World Cup u 19
|}

Current squad
National team in the U19 Korfball world cup 2015

 Coach'': Doboczi Matyas

References 

National korfball teams
Korfball
National team